Pir Komaj (also Romanized as Pīr Komāj) is a village in Mazul Rural District, in the Central District of Nishapur County, Razavi Khorasan Province, Iran. At the 2006 census, its population was 558, in 141 families.

References 

Populated places in Nishapur County